Michael J. Mikos is a professor of foreign languages and literature at the University of Wisconsin–Milwaukee.

He specializes in Polish language, literature, and culture.

He is also a translator and has rendered many works of Polish literature into English.

Selected publications
Adam Mickiewicz. The Sun of Liberty. Warsaw: Energeia, 1998.
Polish Literature from the Middle Ages to the End of the Eighteenth Century. A Bilingual Anthology. Warsaw: Constans, 1999.
Juliusz Slowacki. This Fateful Power. Lublin: Norbertinum, 1999.
The Virgin Mary's Crown. A Bilingual Anthology of Medieval Polish Marian Poetry. Cracow: Collegium Columbinum, 2002 (with Roman Mazurkiewicz).
Polish Romantic Literature. An Anthology. Bloomington: Slavica, 2002.
Polish Literature from 1864 to 1918. An Anthology. Bloomington: Slavica, 2006.

External links 
Michael Mikos, Professor of Foreign Languages and Literature, University of Wisconsin, Milwaukee 
Homepage at UWM
Selection of Mikos writings and translations of poetry from: Polish middle ages, Polish renaissance and Polish baroque

Polish–English translators
Linguists from the United States
Living people
University of Wisconsin–Milwaukee faculty
Year of birth missing (living people)